Ovanes Torosyan (Armenian: Հովհաննես Թորոսյան; Bulgarian: Ованес Торосян; born 7 December 1986) is a Bulgarian film and stage actor, theater director and playwright of Armenian origin.

Career
In 1993, because of the military conflict in Nagorno-Karabakh, his family settled in Sofia, Bulgaria. He went to 76 school "William Saroyan" in Sofia. He graduated in acting from National Academy for Theater and Film Arts, Sofia in 2009 in the class of Prof. Plamen Markov and Ivaylo Hristov. In 2016 he graduated theater directing at National Academy for Theatre and Film Arts.

Ovanes Torosyan is a co-founder of Theater "Replica" in Sofia. He is acting on stage with Ivan Vazov National Theatre in Sofia, Drama theater "Stefan Kirov" in Sliven, Satirical Theater "Aleko Konstantinov", Modern Theatre, Theatre Workshop "Sfumato", Red House, Youth Theatre "Nikolay Binev" and theater "Azaryan".

Ovanes Torosian deals with documentary, improvisational theater and directing.

Filmography

Awards
In 2010 he was nominated for "Icar" in the "debut" in the role of Michael in "Puheniyat" ("The Pillowman").
"Golden Rose" (2010) for Best Supporting Actor in "Eastern Plays" and "Tilt"
Award of the Union of Bulgarian Film Makers (2010) for Best Supporting Actor in "Tilt"
Award of the Union of Bulgarian Film Makers (2011) for Best Actor in "Ave"
Tashkend IFF (2012) - Golden Guepard for Best Actor in "Ave"

References

External links
 

1986 births
Living people
Bulgarian male film actors
21st-century Bulgarian male actors
Bulgarian male television actors
Male actors from Sofia
Bulgarian people of Armenian descent